Daniel Brauneis (born 29 August 1986) is an Austrian footballer who plays for SC Ritzing.

External links
 

Austrian footballers
Austrian Football Bundesliga players
FC Wacker Innsbruck (2002) players
1986 births
Living people
Grazer AK players
SKU Amstetten players
Association football forwards
Footballers from Graz